Robert Woods (born 5 March 1968) is an Australian cyclist. He competed at the 1996 Summer Olympics and the 2000 Summer Olympics.

References

External links
 

1968 births
Living people
Australian male cyclists
Olympic cyclists of Australia
Cyclists at the 1996 Summer Olympics
Cyclists at the 2000 Summer Olympics
Cyclists from Sydney